Football Manager 2020 (officially abbreviated as FM20) is a 2019 football-management simulation video game developed by Sports Interactive and published by Sega as a successor to Football Manager 2019. It was released worldwide on 18 November 2019.

Playable leagues 
The game offers playable teams in 53 countries across five continents: Africa, Asia, Europe, North America and South America. Coverage is heavily slanted towards European teams, with 34 of its 51 constituent countries having playable leagues, while South Africa is the only country of Africa's total 54 that is covered.

There are 118 leagues in this version. The new additions are the Canadian Premier League (added as DLC on 23 December), the Gibraltar National League (forthcoming, post-release), the Gibraltar national team and the two new Welsh second-tier divisions, Cymru North and Cymru South.

Licensing
26 leagues (across 14 countries) were fully licensed for the game, as was KNVB ("Team Holland"). The German national team was reintroduced, having been omitted in FM19, and the Gibraltar national team was licensed for the first time, as was the Gibraltar National League.

21 Italian teams gained licences, including all of the 2019–20 Serie A teams except Brescia and Juventus (the latter of which appeared as Zebre).

The licensed leagues:

Australia
 Hyundai A-League

Denmark
 Superliga

England
 EFL Championship
 EFL League One
 EFL League Two
 Vanarama National League

France
 Ligue 1
 Ligue 2

Germany
 Bundesliga
 2. Bundesliga
 3. Liga

Gibraltar
 Gibraltar national team 
 Gibraltar National League

The Netherlands
 KNVB 
 Eredivisie
 Keuken Kampioen Divisie

Northern Ireland
 NIFL Premiership
 NIFL Championship
 NIFL Premier Intermediate League

Poland
 Ekstraklasa

Scotland
 Ladbrokes Scottish Premiership
 Ladbrokes Scottish Championship
 Ladbrokes Scottish League One
 Ladbrokes Scottish League Two

South Korea
 K League 1
 K League 2

United States and Canada
 MLS

Wales
 Welsh Premier League

Release
In June 2019, it was announced that FM20 will be a launch title for the Stadia streaming platform. On 27 August 2019, Sports Interactive released a trailer for the release of the game.

On 2 October 2019, SI released another trailer about the new feature to be added in the game.

Reception 

Football Manager 2020 received "generally favorable" reviews while Football Manager 2020 Touch for Switch received "mixed or average" reviews according to review aggregator Metacritic.

PC Gamer praised the game's scope and the gameplay's potential, writing, "There's scope to play for countless seasons and still be presented with fresh challenges, and the new Development Centre system makes building for the future more compelling than ever." IGN wrote positively about the game's increased accessibility compared to prior entries, stating, "There’s now real gratification in being a mid-table over-achiever, and entering Football Manager 2020 as a total beginner is a more realistic prospect than before." Dave James of PCGamesN found the game largely addicting, saying, "It looks as much of an iterative update as any FM game, but the added finesse of the new match engine, and the extra depth to the club staffing dynamics and development, make this the best version of the game yet." GamesRadar+ praised the game for its Club Vision mode and Development Centre while criticizing it for its bad press conferences and inconsistent striker AI.

The game sold over 3 million units.

References

External links

2020
Sega video games
Android (operating system) games
IOS games
MacOS games
Stadia games
Windows games
Nintendo Switch games
Video games developed in the United Kingdom
2019 video games